Paul Probst (born May 3, 1950) is a retired Swiss professional ice hockey player who played for HC La Chaux-de-Fonds and EV Zug in the Nationalliga A. He represented the Swiss national team at the 1972 Winter Olympics.

References

External links
Paul Probst's stats at Sports-Reference.com

1950 births
Living people
EV Zug players
GCK Lions players
HC La Chaux-de-Fonds players
Ice hockey players at the 1972 Winter Olympics
Olympic ice hockey players of Switzerland
Swiss ice hockey forwards